Camelia Entekhabifard (also Camelia E. Fard or Camelia Entekhabi-Fard, born 1973) is an Iranian American journalist and the editor-in-chief of the Independent Persian, the first international newspaper published in Persian.

She is an author, columnist and news analyst who writes primarily on Iranian foreign policy as well as Middle Eastern regional issues, including the crisis in Syria, Iraq and Yemen, and the political and security situation in Afghanistan.

Since leaving Iran in 2000, she has been globally recognized as a contributor to the international media. She has reported on Iran and Afghanistan for AP, Reuters, Le Monde Diplomatique, The Independent, Al-Jazeera, New York times, CNN, Newsweek, HuffPost, Al-Arabiya, Al-Hayat, Al-Ahram Weekly, Arab News, Shaq Al-Awsat, Mother Jones, Village Voice among many others. 

Entekhabifard has been covering Afghanistan affairs since 2001. She has travelled around the country and interviewed key Afghan leaders, politicians, former Mujahidin members and ordinary people from all walks of life to bring a balanced, well-informed understanding of politics and social issues in Afghanistan.

She is a prolific speaker about Iran and Afghanistan, having taken the stage at prestigious institutions such as Emirates Security Conference, Columbia University, Asia Society, New York Public Library and Pen Festival.

She is a news commentator and frequently appears on Al-Arabiya, Sky News, Al-Hadath, i24News, Alaraby TV, BBC, CNN and other news channels.

Her book Camelia: Save Yourself by Telling the Truth __a Memoir of Iran was published in March 2007 and translated into several languages including English, Arabic, Portuguese, Italian and Turkish.

Entekhabifard holds a master's degree from the School of Journalism at New York University and another master's degree from the School of International and Public Affairs at Columbia University.

References

External links
 Author biography, from PEN American Center (2007 archived copy)
 ALJAZEERA News
 thriftbooks

Living people

1973 births
Iranian journalists
Iranian women writers
Iranian writers